Villanova del Ghebbo is a comune (municipality) in the Province of Rovigo in the Italian region Veneto, located about  southwest of Venice and about  west of Rovigo.

The municipality of Villanova del Ghebbo contains the frazioni (subdivisions, mainly villages and hamlets) Bornio and Canton.

Villanova del Ghebbo borders the following municipalities: Costa di Rovigo, Fratta Polesine, Lendinara, Lusia, Rovigo.

Demographic evolution

References

External links 

Cities and towns in Veneto